Dimension X was an NBC radio program broadcast on an unsponsored, sustaining basis from April 8, 1950, to September 29, 1951. The first 13 episodes were broadcast live, and the remainder were pre-recorded. Fred Wiehe and Edward King were the directors. Norman Rose was heard as both announcer and narrator.

See also
 List of X Minus One episodes

References

Lists of radio series episodes